Willie Colon may refer to:

Willie Colón (born 1950), American salsa musician and social activist
Willie Colon (American football) (born 1983), American offensive guard